The 180th Street station was a local station on the demolished IRT Third Avenue Line in the Bronx, New York City. It was opened on July 1, 1901, and was one of three stations built when the line was extended to Fordham Plaza. It had three tracks and two side platforms. The next stop to the north was 183rd Street. The next stop to the south was Tremont Avenue–177th Street. The station closed on April 29, 1973.

References

External links 

IRT Third Avenue Line stations
Railway stations in the United States opened in 1901
Railway stations closed in 1973
1901 establishments in New York City
1973 disestablishments in New York (state)
Former elevated and subway stations in the Bronx
Third Avenue